In clothing and similar applications, a gore is a triangular or trapezoidal piece of a textile as might be used in shaping a garment to fit contours of the body.

The word is derived from Old English gār, meaning spear. In the course of time the word came to be used for a piece of cloth used in making clothes. In dressmaking and hatmaking, it refers to triangular or rhomboid pieces of fabric which are combined to create a fuller three dimensional effect. In knitting gloves and mittens, a "thumb gore" is often incorporated from the wrist part way to the tip of the thumb to accommodate the gradually increasing width of the hand.

See also 

 Gusset
 Godet (sewing)

References

Hatmaking
Sewing
Triangles